Paulo Lins (born January 11, 1958, Rio de Janeiro) is a Brazilian author.

Lins grew up in Rio de Janeiro and at the age of seven moved to the City of God favela. Lins's parents came from the impoverished northeastern region of Brazil, which prompted him to examine the racial profile of Brazilian society: "Brazil is a racist country and a racist society, but the funny thing is that nobody will admit to being a racist, and that's the problem. Blacks in Brazil are always in an inferior, subaltern position, but you can't find a white person who is a racist."

His literacy and verbal skill enabled Lins to begin writing sambas and contributing to local culture, which enabled him to escape the cycle of gang violence in the favela and become a successful writer. He published his novel City of God in 1997, which was adapted into the successful 2002 film City of God.

References

External links
 
 

Living people
Brazilian male writers
People associated with Federal University of Rio de Janeiro
1958 births